The 535th Airlift Squadron is part of the 15th Wing at Joint Base Pearl Harbor–Hickam, Hawaii.  It operates C-17 Globemaster III aircraft providing airlift in the Pacific theater.

The squadron was first established during World War II as the 535th Fighter Squadron.  It served as a Replacement Training Unit for Republic P-47 Thunderbolt pilots until it was disbanded in a major reorganization of the Army Air Forces in 1944 designed to streamline training organizations. In 1949, the squadron was reactivated in the Air Force Reserve and served as a corollary unit of the active duty 27th Fighter Group and later, as the 535th Fighter-Escort Squadron of the 12th Fighter-Escort Group until it was ordered to active service in 1951.  Its personnel were used to man active duty units and the squadron was inactivated. The squadron was redesignated in 1952 as the 535th Troop Carrier Squadron, and activated at Atterbury Air Force Base to replace elements of the 923d Reserve Training Wing.  The following year the squadron was inactivated and replaced at Atterbury by the 71st Troop Carrier Squadron.

The unit was activated again in Viet Nam as a C-7 Caribou squadron assigned to the 483d Tactical Airlift Wing and the squadron was awarded three Presidential Unit Citations for its actions during the war. The unit was designated the 535th Airlift Squadron and activated in its current role in 2005.

Mission
The 535th operates eight Boeing C-17 Globemaster III aircraft.  The squadron executes airlift and airdrop missions to support United States Pacific Command and United States Transportation Command.  The 204th Airlift Squadron of the Hawaii Air National Guard is an associate unit of the 535th, flying the same planes.

History

World War II

The squadron was first established as the 535th Fighter Squadron and was activated in November 1943 at Richmond Army Air Base, Virginia. as one of the four original squadrons of the 87th Fighter Group. The squadron began operations with Republic P-47 Thunderbolts as a Replacement Training Unit (RTU).  RTUs were oversized units which trained aircrews prior to their deployment to combat theaters and assignment to an operational group. In January 1944, group headquarters and the squadron moved to Camp Springs Army Air Field, Maryland and the group's remaining squadrons transferred to Millville Army Air Field, New Jersey.

However, the Army Air Forces found that standard military units, based on relatively inflexible tables of organization were proving less well adapted to the training mission.  Accordingly, a more functional system was adopted in which each base was organized into a separate numbered unit. while the groups and squadrons acting as RTUs were disbanded or inactivated. This resulted in the squadron being disbanded in the spring of 1944 and being replaced by the 112th AAF Base Unit (Fighter), which assumed its mission, personnel, and equipment.

Air Force Reserves

The squadron was reactivated in 1949 in the Air Force Reserve at Bergstrom Air Force Base as a corollary unit to Strategic Air Command's 27th Fighter Group. With no aircraft assigned, reservists of the unit flew the North American F-82 Twin Mustangs, and later, the Republic F-84 Thunderjets of the 27th.  When most of the 27th group deployed to Korea for the Korean War, the group became affiliated with the 12th Fighter-Escort Group.  The group was called to active service in May 1951.  After its personnel were used to man other units, the group was inactivated in June.

In 1952 the squadron was redesignated as the 535th Troop Carrier Squadron, became part of the newly constituted 87th Troop Carrier Wing under the wing base organization system, and was activated at Atterbury Air Force Base.  The 87th wing replaced the 923d Reserve Training Wing at Atterbury when reserve flying operations resumed there. The squadron operated Curtiss C-46 Commandos to train reservists.  In February 1953 the 434th Troop Carrier Group was released from active duty and activated in the reserves, and its 71st Troop Carrier Squadron assumed the mission, personnel and equipment of the 535th.

Vietnam War

The squadron was activated in 1967, and took over the DeHavilland Canada C-7A Caribou aircraft operated by the 57th Aviation Company  (U.S. Army) and its tactical airlift mission in South Vietnam.  It operated from several locations in addition to its primary base at Vung Tau Air Base. The 535th airlifted routine cargo and passengers, provided support for Army special forces and radio relay for ground units, airdropped troops and cargo, performed emergency resupply and medical evacuation, and flew other combat airlift missions.  It earned a Navy Presidential Unit Citation, as well as an Air Force Presidential Unit Citation for airlift support of Khe Sanh and other forward bases from January to May 1968.  It earned a second Air Force Presidential Unit Citation for action between April and June 1970 when it participated in the aerial resupply of Dak Seang Special Forces Camp, evacuation of over 2000 refugees from Cambodia, and transportation of the Presidential Southeast Asia Investigation Team to various remote locations in South Vietnam. The squadron flew its last combat mission the day it was inactivated.

Modern era
The squadron was reactivated in 2005 as the 535th Airlift Squadron at Hickam Air Force Base to provide strategic and tactical airlift in the Pacific. It became the first unit located outside the Continental United States to fly the C-17 conducting strategic and tactical airlift. It conducts night vision goggle, low-level, air refueling and austere-airfield operations from within the world's largest area of responsibility. The squadron has provided support for and operated in Operation Enduring Freedom, Operation Iraqi Freedom, and Operation New Dawn. Additionally, the squadron has provided emergency humanitarian relief to Haiti, Pakistan, Samoa, Kwajalein, Indonesia and Japan.

Lineage
 Constituted as the 535th Fighter Squadron (Single Engine) on 24 September 1943
 Activated on 1 November 1943
 Disbanded on 10 April 1944
 Redesignated 535th Fighter Squadron, Twin Engine on 16 May 1949
 Activated in the reserve on 27 June 1949
 Redesignated 535th Fighter-Escort Squadron on 16 March 1950
 Ordered into active service on 1 May 1951
 Inactivated on 25 June 1951
 Redesignated 535th Troop Carrier Squadron, Medium on 26 May 1952
 Activated in the reserve on 15 June 1952
 Inactivated on 1 February 1953
 Redesignated 535th Troop Carrier Squadron  and activated on 12 October 1966 (not organized)
 Organized on 1 January 1967
 Redesignated 535th Tactical Airlift Squadron on 1 August 1967
 Inactivated on 24 January 1972
 Redesignated 535th Airlift Squadron on 1 April 2005
 Activated on 18 April 2005

Commanders
Capt George G. Dewey, 6 October 1943; Maj George V. Williams, 3–10 Apr 1944; Lt Col Leo J. Ehmann, 1 January 1967; Lt Col Edwin B. Owens, 4 January 1967; Lt Col Joseph Faulkner, 15 December 1967; Lt Col Harry F. Hunter, 21 June 1968; Lt Col Richard D. Kimball, 12 April 1969; Lt Col Clem B. Myers, 1 November 1969; Lt Col John J. Hanley, 13 November 1969; Lt Col John D. Pennekamp, 18 July 1970; Lt Col Thomas D. Moyle, 3 October 1970; Lt Col Rupert S. Richardson, 31 December 1970; Lt Col Dean S. Downing, 12 September 1971; Lt Col James S. Knox, 8 Dec 1971 – 24 Jan 1972; Lt Col Chris Davis 2005–2006; Lt Col Scott Shapiro 2006–2008; Lt Col Casey Eaton 2008–2009; Lt Col Andy Leshikar 2009–2011; Lt Col Pat Winstead 2011–2013; Lt Col Gregg Johnson 2013–2015; Lt Col Scott Raleigh 2015–2017; Lt Col Chad Cisewski 2017–2019; Lt Col Joshua Holaday 2019–Present

Assignments
 87th Fighter Group: 1 November 1943 – 10 April 1944
 87th Fighter Group (later 87th Fighter-Escort Group): 27 June 1949 – 25 June 1951
 87th Troop Carrier Group: 15 June 1952 – 1 February 1953
 Pacific Air Forces: 12 October 1966 (not organized)
 483d Troop Carrier Wing (later 483d Tactical Airlift Wing): 1 January 1967 – 24 January 1972
 15th Operations Group 18 April 2005 – present

Stations
 Richmond Army Air Base, Virginia, 1 November 1943
 Camp Springs Army Air Field, Maryland, 21 January 1944 – 10 April 1944
 Bergstrom Air Force Base, Texas, 27 June 1949 – 25 June 1951
 Atterbury Air Force Base, Indiana, 15 June 1952 – 1 February 1953
 Vung Tau Airfield, South Vietnam, 1 January 1967
 Cam Ranh Air Base, South Vietnam, 21 January 1970 – 24 January 1972
 Hickam Air Force Base (later Joint Base Pearl Harbor–Hickam), Hawaii, 18 April 2005 – present

Aircraft
 Republic P-47 Thunderbolt (1943–1944)
 Douglas A-24 Banshee (1943–1944)
 North American F-82 Twin Mustang (1949–1950)
 North American T-6 Texan (1950)
 Lockheed T-33 Shooting Star (1950)
 Republic F-84 Thunderjet (1950–1951)
 Curtiss C-46 Commando (1952–1953)
 de Havilland Canada C-7 Caribou (1967–1972)
 Boeing C-17 Globemaster III (2005–present)

Awards and campaigns

References
 Notes

 Citations

Bibliography

Further reading

External links
 
 

Military units and formations in Hawaii
Airlift squadrons of the United States Air Force
Military units and formations established in 1943